The Under Cover Sessions is a five-track EP by American heavy metal band Ill Niño, released on November 7, 2006, via Cement Shoes Records. It is their first release on the label, after departing Roadrunner Records in June 2006. The EP was the first to feature Diego Verduzco on guitar (originally in Odum), as a stand-in for Jardel Paisante, who had not been a part of the group since the spring of 2006. He was said to be dealing with personal family problems. Verduzco was also on the photo shoots of Ill Niño for the EP, so many fans saw him as a full-time replacement for Jardel Paisante. Only 20,000 copies of the EP were released. It sold 1,300 copies during its first week of release.

Track listing

Personnel
 Cristian Machado - vocals
 Ahrue Luster - lead guitar
 Diego Verduzco - rhythm guitar
 Lazaro Piña - bass
 Dave Chavarri - drums
 Danny Couto - percussion
 Omar Clavijo - keyboards
 Chino Moreno - vocals on "Zombie Eaters"

References

Ill Niño albums
Albums produced by Andy Johns
2006 EPs